Bolesław Proch (4 February 1952 – 22 December 2012) was a Polish international motorcycle speedway rider who was Polish Junior Champion in 1974.

Early life and career
Born in Świebodzin, Proch first rode for Falubaz in his home town of Zielona Góra in 1973, winning the Polish Junior Championship the following year and finishing fourth in the Silver Helmet tournament. In 1976 he rode in the British League for Reading Racers, averaging over five points per match. In 1977, in mid-season, Reading were ordered to weaken their team as it was found to be exceeding the points limit set by the BSPA which resulted in Proch moving to Leicester Lions in a deal that saw Doug Underwood moving to Reading.

He returned to Poland where he rode for Stal Gorzów Wielkopolski (1977–1980) and Polonia Bydgoszcz (1981–1987).

World Final appearances

World Team Cup
 1976 –  London, White City Stadium (with Edward Jancarz / Zenon Plech / Marek Cieślak  / Jerzy Rembas) – 2nd – 28pts (1)
 1984 –  Leszno (with Roman Jankowski / Zenon Kasprzak / Leonard Raba / Zenon Plech) – 4th – 8pt (0)

World Pairs Championship
 1978 –  Chorzów, Silesian Stadium (with Edward Jancarz) – 5th – 15pts (2)

References 

1952 births
2012 deaths
Polish speedway riders
Reading Racers riders
Leicester Lions riders
Polonia Bydgoszcz riders
People from Świebodzin
Sportspeople from Lubusz Voivodeship